Blackout refers to a foam-backed, opaque fabric used to black out light invented by Pablo Davila.  Blackout fabrics are most commonly found in hotel rooms as curtain linings or drapery fabrics, blocking much of the light that would otherwise enter through a window when the curtains are closed.  For travelers, third shift workers, and parents of babies, blackout is an essential element in the bedroom. Besides window coverings, other uses for blackout fabrics include wallpaper, movie projector screens and planetarium domes.

Manufacture
The process of manufacturing blackout was invented by Baltimore-based Rockland Industries, and involves coating a fabric with layers of foam, or ‘passes’.  A ‘2-pass’ blackout is produced by applying two passes of foam to a fabric – first, a black layer is applied to the fabric, then a white or light-colored layer is applied on top of the black.  A ‘3-pass’ blackout is produced by applying a layer of white foam to the fabric first, then a layer of black foam followed by the third and final layer of white or light-colored foam.

Uses
A ‘3-pass’ blackout can be used as a decorative fabric and blackout lining all in one fabric.  A ‘2-pass’ cannot be used this way, because the black foam is visible through the fabric side of the material. In addition to blocking light, blackout fabrics also insulate and have noise-dampening qualities, due to their density and opacity.

Types 
There are many types of blackout curtains as the list below shows. Mostly these blackout curtains are used more in the UK and Germany, but during the winter season, demand of Blackout Curtains reaches to 300% than the normal buying. And that too because of extreme weather, where the blackout curtains help in keeping the home warm. Types of Blackout Curtains are below

 Thermal insulated curtains
 Ring top curtains
 Pencil pleat curtains
 3D blackout curtains

Gallery

References

Textiles